Fear No Evil is the eleventh studio album of the German female hard rock singer Doro. It was released worldwide in 2009 by AFM Records.
The album was produced and engineered by usual collaborators Andreas Bruhn, Chris Lietz and Torsten Sickert and reflects in the songs a strong celebrative mood. In fact, titles like "Night of the Warlock", "Celebrate", "25 Years" and the new collaboration with the American Joey Balin, who had produced the last Warlock album, were meant to celebrate the 25th anniversary of the first LP released by Doro Pesch, Burning the Witches in 1984. On 13 December 2008, a big celebrative concert with dozens of guests was held in Doro's native city of Düsseldorf, featuring also some of the musicians who had participated in the making of this album;Tarja Turunen (former singer of Nightwish) performed a duet with Doro on "Walking with the Angels", Saxon singer Biff Byford sang on the single "Celebrate" with many female metal singers that Doro had befriended during her many tours and festival attendances.

The album was re-released in 2010 in an Ultimate Collector's Edition triple CD issue, comprising the EPs Celebrate – The Night of the Warlock and Herzblut.

Fear No Evil reached position No. 11 on the German Longplay chart.

Track listing

Limited edition has "Herzblut" music video.

Personnel

Band members
 Doro Pesch – vocals
 Nick Douglas – bass
 Joe Taylor – guitars
 Johnny Dee – drums
 Oliver Palotai – keyboards, guitars
 Luca Princiotta – keyboards, guitars

Additional musicians
 Ingulf Brammer – backing vocals
 Andreas Bruhn – guitars, bass
 Lukas Dylong – backing vocals
 Dennis Krueger – guitar
 Chris Lietz – guitar, keyboards
 Dirk Schoppen – backing vocals
 Torsten Sickert – keyboards, guitars, bass
 Tarja Turunen – vocals on "Walking with the Angels"
 Klaus Vanscheidt – guitar, backing vocals

Production
 Kai Blankenberg – mastering
 Andreas Bruhn – producer, engineer, mixing
 Jarred Cannon – engineer
 Rudy Kronenberger – engineer
 Chris Lietz – engineer, mixing, mastering
 Dan Malsch – engineer
Doro Pesch – producer
 Torsten Sickert – programming, producer, engineer, mixing

References

External links
American site

Doro (musician) albums
2009 albums
AFM Records albums